The 2010 Indy Racing League Firestone Indy Lights season was the 25th Indy Lights season. It was contested over thirteen races beginning on March 28 on the streets of St. Petersburg, Florida, and ended on October 2 at Homestead-Miami Speedway.

Jean-Karl Vernay became the first European to win the championship title since Alex Lloyd in 2007, after taking five victories and ten top-five placings at the wheel of his Sam Schmidt Motorsports car. His championship title, guaranteed by just starting the final race at Homestead, also garnered him with the Rookie of the Year award, having moved into the series from Europe and the Formula 3 Euro Series. Another driver with ten top-fives, James Hinchcliffe finished second in the title race for Team Moore Racing, a race winner at Long Beach, Edmonton and Chicagoland Speedway.

Third place was fought between AFS Racing/Andretti Autosport team-mates Martin Plowman and Charlie Kimball, with Plowman coming out on top by six points; Plowman won a race at Mid-Ohio, while Kimball finished four races in second place including three in succession early in the season. Other drivers to take wins were Wade Cunningham – winning the Firestone Freedom 100 for the third time – and Sebastián Saavedra at Iowa Speedway, while two drivers visited victory lane for the first time; Pippa Mann at Kentucky Speedway and Brandon Wagner at Homestead in their second seasons in the formula.

Team and driver chart
 All drivers competed in Firestone Firehawk–shod, Dallara chassis.

Schedule

Open Testing

Firestone Indy Lights Barber Open Test
Friday February 26, 2010
Barber Motorsports Park, Birmingham, AL
Testing weather: , Sunny
Testing Summary:

Indianapolis Open Test – Indy Lights
Friday May 14, 2010
Indianapolis Motor Speedway, Speedway, IN
Testing weather: 
Testing Summary:

Race results

Race summaries

Round 1: Streets of St. Petersburg
Sunday March 28, 2010 – 12:58 p.m. EDT
Streets of St. Petersburg – St. Petersburg, Florida; Temporary street circuit, 
Distance: 45 laps / ; reduced to 35 laps /  due to rain.
Race weather: , overcast at start with rain falling later.
Pole position winner: #2 James Hinchcliffe, 1:06.3496 sec, 
Most laps led: #7 Jean-Karl Vernay, 31
Race report: On turn one of the first lap, Philip Major divebombed the field, making contact with polesitter James Hinchcliffe, taking both out of the race. Later that lap, Adrián Campos Jr. who had made contact with Pippa Mann during the start nosed into the wall in turn 8. Mann retired from the race, after spinning under caution. On the lap four restart Jean-Karl Vernay passed Sebastián Saavedra for the lead and was later spun by Charlie Kimball in turn four, bringing out another caution. The race was red flagged on lap six during that caution period due to moisture, allowing the teams to pit and change to full wet tires. The race went back to green on lap nine. On the restart, leader Vernay pulled out to a 9-second lead over Junior Strous who had climbed to second. However, on lap 17 Strous spun in turn 1, handing Vernay a 17-second lead over new second-place Jan Heylen. On lap 25 Saavedra hit the wall bringing out the caution and erasing Vernay's 20 second lead over Heylen. However, on the resultant restart with 8 minutes remaining (the race had become a timed race due to the rain), Vernay was able to pull away and win by 11 seconds over Heylen. Jonathan Summerton spun in the final corner of the last lap and fell from fourth to eighth.

Round 2: Barber Motorsports Park
Sunday April 11, 2010 – 1:13 p.m. EDT / 12:13 p.m. CDT
Barber Motorsports Park – Birmingham, Alabama; Permanent road course, 
Distance: 40 laps / 
Race weather: , clear skies
Pole position winner: #7 Jean-Karl Vernay, 1:14.8726 sec, 
Most laps led: #7 Jean-Karl Vernay, 39
Race report: At the start, Charlie Kimball moved into the lead ahead of Jean-Karl Vernay but was deemed to have jumped the start. On lap two, Kimball conceded the lead to Vernay and the Sam Schmidt Motorsports driver would not relinquish the lead en route to his second consecutive victory. Kimball finished second ahead of Sebastián Saavedra, Martin Plowman and James Hinchcliffe. Two drivers did not finish the race: Rodrigo Barbosa suffered a mechanical failure, while Carmen Jordá retired after a spin.

Round 3: Streets of Long Beach
Sunday April 18, 2010 – 1:40 p.m. EDT / 10:40 a.m. PDT
Streets of Long Beach – Long Beach, California; Temporary street circuit, 
Distance: 45 laps / 
Race weather: , clear skies
Pole position winner: #2 James Hinchcliffe, 1:14.6261 sec, 
Most laps led: #2 James Hinchcliffe, 45
Race report: Starting from his second pole of the season, James Hinchcliffe led the field through Turn 1 on the opening lap as Charlie Kimball overhauled Jean-Karl Vernay for second place. The three drivers then held their respective positions for the duration of the race, as the other drivers battled behind. Sebastián Saavedra and Martin Plowman rounded out the top five placings. Dan Clarke and Junior Strous both ran into early trouble, with Clarke suffering a mechanical problem and Strous running into the barriers on Lap 9. Clarke returned to the race six laps down, and wound up thirteenth at the end of the race. Stefan Wilson suffered an electrical problem, Rodrigo Barbosa was parked after causing two of the race's four full course cautions with spins and Adrián Campos Jr. crashed heavily at Turn 1 on Lap 34, causing the third caution. Almost immediately after the race returned to green after the Campos crash, the yellow flags flew again after Gustavo Yacamán and Niall Quinn were both involved in incidents at the track's Fountain section; Yacamán having been punted from behind by Quinn's team-mate Tõnis Kasemets, while Quinn spun by himself. On the penultimate lap, Sam Schmidt Motorsports' Philip Major ran into his team-mate James Winslow, forcing the British driver into the barrier and was eventually scored in twelfth position.

Round 4: Firestone Freedom 100
Friday May 28, 2010 – 12:30 p.m. EDT / 11:30 a.m. CDT
Indianapolis Motor Speedway – Speedway, Indiana; Permanent racing facility, 
Distance: 40 laps / 
Race weather: , clear skies
Pole position winner: #11 Pippa Mann, 1:35.7505 sec,  (2-lap)
Most laps led: #77 Wade Cunningham, 38
Race report: Pippa Mann led the field to the green flag, but was immediately overtaken by Wade Cunningham, with Charlie Kimball, series returnee Jeff Simmons and Martin Plowman all getting ahead of Mann by the end of the first lap. Mann's race ended at Turn 1 of lap three, being an innocent victim in an accident with Simmons, producing the race's only caution period. Championship leader Jean-Karl Vernay hit trouble early in the race, making a lengthy pit-stop on lap one, returning to the field several laps down. When the race returned to green on lap nine, Cunningham led from Kimball, Plowman, Dan Clarke and Philip Major. Kimball took the lead on lap ten before Cunningham repassed him on lap eleven. James Hinchcliffe progressed through the field, and ran as high as second place for the middle portion of the race, before Kimball reasserted himself in the position. He once again took the lead from Cunningham before the New Zealander took the lead for good on lap 34. Cunningham held his rivals off for the remaining laps, as he took his third Freedom 100 victory by 0.4368 seconds from Kimball, with Hinchcliffe, Clarke and Plowman rounding out the top five positions. Along with Simmons and Mann, Arie Luyendyk Jr. retired from the race due to mechanical gremlins. With Vernay finishing down the field, his championship lead over Kimball was trimmed to just five points.

Round 5: AvoidTheStork.com 100
Saturday June 19, 2010 – 9:40 p.m. EDT / 8:40 p.m. CDT
Iowa Speedway – Newton, Iowa; Permanent racing facility, 
Distance: 115 laps / 
Race weather: , clear skies
Pole position winner: #29 Sebastián Saavedra, 40.0594 sec,  (2-lap)
Most laps led: #29 Sebastián Saavedra, 115
Race report:

Round 6: Corning 100
Sunday July 4, 2010 – 1:30 p.m. EDT
Watkins Glen International – Watkins Glen, New York; Permanent racing facility, 
Distance: 30 laps / 
Race weather: , clear skies
Pole position winner: #2 James Hinchcliffe, 1:37.3593 sec, 
Most laps led: #2 James Hinchcliffe, 18
Race report: Charlie Kimball suffered problems even before the start of the race, stalling his car at Turn 7. His stall forced the start to be waved off a lap. When the race did eventually get under way, James Hinchcliffe led Stefan Wilson into Turn 1. Wilson would be demoted to fourth by the end of the lap, as both championship leader Jean-Karl Vernay and Sebastián Saavedra found a way past the British driver. The first of two cautions flew on lap two as Dan Clarke was tipped into a spin by Pippa Mann and both cars found the wall at Turn 9. After the restart, Wilson was demoted yet further, as debutant Anders Krohn found a way by. Krohn would fall to tenth position by the race's conclusion. Wilson's engine blew at the beginning of lap fourteen, causing the second and final caution due to fluid leaking out of his Bryan Herta Autosport car all the way along the front straight. Vernay found a way past Hinchcliffe on lap nineteen, using the Canadian's slipstream to full effect, passing him into the Inner Loop. Vernay held the lead to the end, as he won his third race of the season to extend his championship lead. Hinchcliffe finished in close proximity to Vernay in second, with Saavedra, Martin Plowman and James Winslow – returning to the series, and starting last out of the 14-car grid – rounded out the top five placings.

Round 7: Toronto 100
Sunday July 18, 2010 – 10:25 a.m. EDT
Streets of Toronto – Toronto, Ontario; Temporary street circuit, 
Distance: 50 laps / 
Race weather: , clear skies
Pole position winner: #7 Jean-Karl Vernay, 1:05.2989 sec, 
Most laps led: #7 Jean-Karl Vernay, 50
Race report: Jean-Karl Vernay dominated en route to his fourth victory of the season, leading every lap of the race from pole position. After fending off sufficient pressure from James Hinchcliffe, Vernay extended his lead despite two full course cautions for incidents at Turn 8. Hinchcliffe was due to finish second behind Vernay but made a mistake into Turn 3 and allowed Dan Clarke and Gustavo Yacamán to fill the remaining podium slots. Charlie Kimball also looked for the pass into Turn 5, but ended up colliding with Hinchcliffe sending him into the wall and a tenth-place classification. Kimball finished fourth ahead of a recovering Stefan Wilson, who set the fastest lap after earlier going down the escape road due to an error. Other retirees from the race were Sebastián Saavedra who lost fourth gear, and Carmen Jordá who spun at Turn 8.

Round 8: Edmonton 100
Sunday July 25, 2010 – 2:57 p.m. EDT / 12:57 p.m. MDT
Edmonton City Centre Airport – Edmonton, Alberta; Temporary airport course, 
Distance: 50 laps / 
Race weather: , clear skies
Pole position winner: #2 James Hinchcliffe, 1:06.2160 sec, 
Most laps led: #2 James Hinchcliffe, 50
Race report: James Hinchcliffe led from start to finish, as he cut Jean-Karl Vernay's championship lead by thirteen to 55, in a race which lacked overtaking moves. The top five qualifiers – Hinchcliffe, Vernay, Martin Plowman, Charlie Kimball and Dan Clarke – claimed the top five placings, with only Carmen Jordá failing to finish out of the 13-car grid.

Round 9: Mid-Ohio 100
Sunday August 8, 2010 – 12:30 p.m. EDT
Mid-Ohio Sports Car Course – Lexington, Ohio; Permanent racing facility, 
Distance: 40 laps / 
Race weather: , clear skies
Pole position winner: #27 Martin Plowman, 1:12.8624 sec, 
Most laps led: #27 Martin Plowman, 40
Race report: Martin Plowman became an Indy Lights victor after leading from start-to-finish to tie James Hinchcliffe for second in the championship. Plowman held off the challenge of Hinchcliffe during the race, with the Canadian driver running wide midway through the race. British drivers claimed a 1-2 as Dan Clarke finished second ahead of Plowman's team-mate Charlie Kimball and the Bryan Herta Autosport cars of Stefan Wilson and Sebastián Saavedra. Championship leader Jean-Karl Vernay struggled all weekend and finished in eighth, just behind Hinchcliffe.

Round 10: Carneros 100
Sunday August 22, 2010 – 2:45 p.m. EDT / 11:45 a.m. PDT
Infineon Raceway – Sonoma, California; Permanent racing facility, 
Distance: 40 laps / 
Race weather: , clear skies
Pole position winner: #7 Jean-Karl Vernay, 1:23.5582 sec, 
Most laps led: #7 Jean-Karl Vernay, 40
Race report:

Round 11: Chicagoland 100
Saturday August 28, 2010 – 5:15 p.m. EDT / 4:15 p.m. CDT
Chicagoland Speedway – Joliet, Illinois; Permanent racing facility, 
Distance: 67 laps / 
Race weather: , clear skies
Pole position winner: #27 Martin Plowman, 57.7510 sec,  (2-lap)
Most laps led: #11 Pippa Mann, 35
Race report:

Round 12: Drive Smart Buckle-Up Kentucky 100
Saturday September 4, 2010 – 5:30 p.m. EDT
Kentucky Speedway – Sparta, Kentucky; Permanent racing facility, 
Distance: 67 laps / 
Race weather: , scattered clouds
Pole position winner: #11 Pippa Mann, 55.9447 sec,  (2-lap)
Most laps led: #11 Pippa Mann, 67
Race report: Pippa Mann led from start to finish to join Ana Beatriz as female winners in Indy Lights, as she pulled away from her rivals to a winning margin of nearly seven seconds. Jean-Karl Vernay had a chance to wrap up the title with a round to spare, but with James Hinchcliffe finishing ahead of him, his 48-point championship lead meant that Vernay will only need to start the final race on October 2 to become champion. Adrián Campos Jr. equalled his best finish to place fourth, a car length behind Vernay while Gustavo Yacamán finished fifth after starting on the back row. Daniel Herrington returned to the series as a raceday replacement at Bryan Herta Autosport for Sebastián Saavedra who parted company with the team but only made it as far as lap two, when he was involved in a three-car crash with team-mate Stefan Wilson and Philip Major, which brought out the only caution of the race, before the race was halted for 15 minutes to sweep the circuit of debris. All three drivers were unhurt in the incident.

Round 13: Fuzzy's Ultra Premium Vodka 100
Saturday October 2, 2010 – 3:45 p.m. EDT
Homestead-Miami Speedway – Homestead, Florida; Permanent racing facility, 
Distance: 67 laps / 
Race weather: , clear skies
Pole position winner: #11 Pippa Mann, 57.2999 sec,  (2-lap)
Most laps led: #32 Brandon Wagner, 66
Race report:

Driver standings

 Ties in points broken by number of wins, or best finishes.

References

External links
Indy Lights Series website

Indy Lights seasons
Indy Lights
Indy Lights